David Keith Lynch (born January 20, 1946) is an American filmmaker, painter, television director, visual artist, musician, and occasional actor. Known for his surrealist films, he has developed his own unique cinematic style which has been dubbed "Lynchian" and is characterized by its dream imagery and meticulous sound design. The surreal and, in many cases, violent elements to his films have earned them the reputation that they "disturb, offend or mystify" their audiences.

Lynch's oeuvre includes short and feature-length films, music videos, documentaries and television episodes, while his involvement in these ranges from direction, production, and screenwriting to acting and sound design. Lynch's first project was the 1967 short Six Men Getting Sick (Six Times), an animated film which blended elements of sculpture and painting into its animation. His first feature-length project, 1977's Eraserhead, became a cult film and launched his commercial career. It also marked his first collaboration with Jack Nance, an actor who would appear in many more of Lynch's productions until his death in 1996. Lynch's other feature films include the critically successful The Elephant Man (1980), Blue Velvet (1986) and Mulholland Drive (2001), all of which went on to earn Academy Award nominations, and the commercial flop Dune.

Lynch has also branched out into television, and later, internet-based series. His first foray into the medium was Twin Peaks, a joint venture with Mark Frost. Twin Peaks became a cult success, leading to Lynch and Frost working together on a number of other projects, including On the Air and American Chronicles. In 2002 Lynch began producing two series of shorts released through his official website: the Flash-animated DumbLand and Rabbits. Having begun acting in his 1972 short The Amputee, Lynch went on to appear on-camera in Twin Peaks, Zelly and Me, and Dune. From 2010 to 2013, Lynch appeared in a recurring voice role in the animated series The Cleveland Show.

Feature films

Short films

Television series

Web series

Music videos

Commercials

Concert films

Other works

Acting roles

Film

Short films

Television

Documentary films

Executive producer

References

Bibliography

External links 
 

Filmography
Director filmographies
Male actor filmographies
American filmographies